Myzopoda, which has two described species, is the only genus in the bat family Myzopodidae. Myzopodidae is unique as the only family of bats presently endemic to Madagascar. However, fossil discoveries indicate that the family has an ancient lineage in Africa, extending from the Pleistocene as far back as the late Eocene. Based on nuclear DNA sequence data, Myzopodidae appears to be basal in the Gondwanan superfamily Noctilionoidea, most of whose members are neotropical. The origin and initial diversification of Noctilionoidea may have occurred in Africa prior to their dispersal to Australia and South America, probably via Antarctica. On the basis of fossil and molecular clock evidence, myzopodids are estimated to have split off from the rest of Noctilionoidea about 50 (46 to 57) million years ago.

Species
Genus Myzopoda
Madagascar sucker-footed bat, Myzopoda aurita Milne-Edwards & Grandidier, 1878
Western sucker-footed bat, Myzopoda schliemanni Goodman, Rakotondraparany & Kofoky, 2006

See also
List of bats of Madagascar

References

Myzopodidae
Bat genera
Extant Pleistocene first appearances
Taxa named by Henri Milne-Edwards
Taxa named by Alfred Grandidier
Taxonomy articles created by Polbot